Călui is a commune in Olt County, Oltenia, Romania. It is composed of two villages, Călui and Gura Căluiu. These were part of Oboga Commune until 2004, when they were split off.

References

Communes in Olt County
Localities in Oltenia